The field fortification of Tiefenstürmig is a levelled, probably prehistorical, sector fortification at a height of  in the area known as Heiligkreuzholz about 600 metres east of the village centre of Tiefenstürmig, in the market municipality of Eggolsheim in the county of Forchheim in the south German state of Bavaria.

Nothing has survived of the circular rampart site and there is no visible evidence of a medieval ground level residence.

Literature 
 
 Klaus Schwarz: Die vor- und frühgeschichtlichen Geländedenkmäler Oberfrankens. (Materialhefte zur bayerischen Vorgeschichte, Series B, Vol. 5). Verlag Michael Laßleben, Kallmünz, 1955, p. 84.

External links 
 

Castles in Bavaria
Forchheim (district)
Eggolsheim